NY Virginis is a binary star about  away. The primary belongs to the rare class of subdwarf B stars, being former red giants with their hydrogen envelope completely stripped by a stellar companion. The companion is a red dwarf star. Under a proposed classification scheme for hot subdwarfs it would be class sdB1VII:He1. This non-standard system indicates that it is a "normal" luminosity for a hot subdwarf and that the spectrum is dominated by hydrogen rather than helium.

Planetary system
In 2011, variations in the timing of the binary star's eclipses were used to infer the presence of a superjovian planet, NY Virginis (AB) b, on a wide orbit, with a second planet being suspected. A study in 2014 found that a two-planet model was preferred. The orbits of these two planets are near or at a 3:10 mutual orbital resonance. Another two-planet model with significant orbital eccentricity, updated to account for changes in eclipse timing not predicted by previous models, was published in 2019.

Studies in 2022 have noted that since planetary models generally fail to predict subsequent changes in eclipse timing, and the most recent two-planet model as of 2021 results in orbits that are unstable on an astronomically-short timescale, a different explanation for the eclipse timing variations may be needed.

References

Virgo (constellation)
Hypothetical planetary systems
Algol variables
Multi-star planetary systems
J13384814-0201491
B-type subdwarfs
Very rapidly pulsating hot stars
M-type main-sequence stars
Virginis, NY